A list of films produced in Hong Kong in 1975:

1975

External links
 IMDB list of Hong Kong films
 Hong Kong films of 1975 at HKcinemamagic.com

1975
Hong Kong
Films